Enterovibrio baiacu is a bacterium species from the genus of Enterovibrio which has been isolated from the viscera of a pufferfish (Sphoeroides spengleri).

References 

Vibrionales
Bacteria described in 2020